Elections to Solihull Metropolitan Borough Council were held on 22 May 2014, alongside European elections.

Candidates nominated for 2014 Solihull Metropolitan Borough Council Elections

References

2014 English local elections
2014
2010s in the West Midlands (county)